MVT may refer to:

Science and technology
 Mechanical Vapor Transfer, a desalination technology by distillation

Other uses
 Maldives time, UTC+05:00
 Mapnik Vector Tile, vector tile format
 The Marchetti MVT, an Italian fighter aircraft of 1919
 Marginal value theorem, a behavioral ecology theorem 
 Marrakesh VIP Treaty
 Mean value theorem, a mathematical theorem 
 Minimum Viable Technology, agile principles applied to engineering/technology teams
 Mississippi Valley-Type carbonate hosted lead-zinc ore deposits
 Mount Vernon Terminal Railway
 Mount Vernon Trail
 Multiprogramming with a variable number of tasks, an option of mainframe computer operating system
 Multivariate testing (disambiguation)

Mvt, mvt, or MVT may refer to:
 Movement (music), a large division of a larger composition or musical notes